The 1899 Oregon Agricultural Aggies football team represented Oregon Agricultural College (now known as Oregon State University) as an independent during the 1899 college football season. In their first and only season under head coach Hiland Orlando Stickney, the Aggies compiled a 3–2 record and outscored their opponents by a combined total of 76 to 60. The Aggies lost to Oregon (0-38). Fred Walters was the team captain.

Schedule

References

Further reading
 Walter Camp (ed.), Foot Ball Rules as Recommended to the University Athletic Club by the Rules Committee. New York: American Sports Publishing Co., 1899.

Oregon Agricultural
Oregon State Beavers football seasons
Oregon Agricultural Aggies football